It was a Dacian fortified town.

References

Dacian fortresses in Covasna County
Historic monuments in Covasna County